Mary Wolf Wilkinson Streep (July 30, 1915 – September 29, 2001) was an American fine-artist and art editor. Her daughter is actress Meryl Streep.

Life and career
Born Mary Wolf Wilkinson in Brooklyn, New York, the daughter of Mary Agnes (née Wolf; 1886-1976) and Harry Rockefellow Wilkinson. She grew up in Madison, New Jersey, graduating from Madison High School, she then studied fine art at the Art Students League in New York.

Streep trained as a fine artist and became the art-editor for Home Furnishings Magazine and also did commercial artwork on a freelance basis. Mary had an art studio in the back of her home. She married pharmaceutical company executive Harry Wilbur Streep Jr. (1909-2003) They had a daughter, Mary Louise "Meryl" Streep, and two sons, Dana Streep and Harry Wilbur Streep III (husband of actress Maeve Kinkead). She is also the grandmother of Streep's children, musician Henry Wolfe, actresses Mamie Gummer and Grace Gummer, and model Louisa Gummer. Her son-in-law, Don Gummer, is also an artist, a sculptor.

Her daughter Meryl Streep has often stated in interviews that her mother has been the inspiration for some of her characters she has played on the screen. Mary enrolled her daughter in voice lessons at the age of twelve after noticing her daughter's need to perform.

Death
Streep died at Cornell Medical Center from complications of heart disease after a short illness. Her husband died two years later on July 22, 2003, aged 92. They were residents of Mason's Island, Connecticut.

References

External links
Mary Wilkinson Streep on Find A Grave

1915 births
2001 deaths
Art Students League of New York alumni
American magazine editors
20th-century American painters
20th-century American printmakers
20th-century American women artists
American women painters
American women printmakers
Artists from Brooklyn
Painters from New Jersey
Painters from New York City
People from Madison, New Jersey
Women magazine editors
Madison High School (New Jersey) alumni
Meryl Streep